Punk Rock Is Dead is the debut solo album by former Misfits singer Michale Graves. Horror High had approached Michale to record this as a sort of farewell before he was to embark on a stint with the United States Marines.

Track listings

2005 debut albums
Michale Graves albums